Cow Horn Lake is a lake in Itasca County, in the U.S. state of Minnesota and is found at an elevation of .

Cow Horn Lake was named on account of its outline having the shape of a cow's horn.

See also
List of lakes in Minnesota

References

Lakes of Minnesota
Lakes of Itasca County, Minnesota